The Canons of Dort, or Canons of Dordrecht, formally titled The Decision of the Synod of Dort on the Five Main Points of Doctrine in Dispute in the Netherlands, is the judgment of the National Synod held in the Dutch city of Dordrecht in 1618–19. At the time, Dordrecht was often referred to in English as Dort or Dordt.

Today the Canons of Dort form part of the Three Forms of Unity, one of the confessional standards of many of the Reformed churches around the world, including the Netherlands, South Africa, Australia, and North America. Their continued use as a standard sets apart the Reformed Churches from those adhering to the doctrines of Jacob Arminius, the Remonstrants.

These canons are a judicial decision on the doctrinal points in dispute from the Arminian controversy of that day. Following the death of Arminius (1560–1609), in 1610, his followers set forth the Five Articles of Remonstrance The five articles formulated their points of departure from the Confessional Reformed beliefs of the Belgic Confession that they had sworn ministerial oaths to teach and uphold. The Canons of Dort represents the judgment of the Synod against this Remonstrance. In later years, Arminian theology received official acceptance by the State and has since continued in various forms within Protestantism, especially within the Methodist churches.

The canons were not intended to be a comprehensive explanation of Reformed doctrine, but only an exposition on the five points of doctrine in dispute. The five points of Calvinism, remembered by the mnemonic TULIP and popularized by a 1963 booklet, are popularly said to summarize the 1618 Canons of Dort. While related to the 1618 Canons of Dort, the Five Points of Calvinism do not actually come from the 1618 document itself but from an earlier document and correction against the Arminians during the same controversy. The Five Points of Calvinism comes from the Counter Remonstrance of 1611

Notes

References

Further reading

But for the Grace of God by Cornelis P. Venema
The Golden Chain of Salvation by John Bouwers
Unspeakable Comfort by Peter Feenstra
The Voice of Our Fathers by Homer Hoeksema
The Reformed Doctrine of Predestination by Lorraine Boettner
The Synod of Dordt by Thomas Scott
The Canons of Dordt by Henry Peterson
The Five Points of Calvinism by David Steele and Curtis Thomas
The Works of John Owen, Vol. 10
TULIP by William Jay Hornbeck II

External links
Christian Reformed Church: The Canons of Dort
The Canons of Dort in Latin, Dutch, English, Russian and Ukrainian
The Canons of Dort in Vietnamese Giáo Luật của Dordt (Dort) bằng Tiếng Việt
Audio Recording of the Canons of Dort (mp3)

1619 works
17th-century Christian texts
Synod of Dort
Three Forms of Unity
Latin texts